The Sichuan–Guizhou railway or Chuanqian railway, is a single-track electrified railroad in southwest China between Chongqing Municipality and Guiyang, Guizhou Province.  The shorthand name for the line, Chuanqian, is derived from the shorthand names of Sichuan Province (Chuan 川), to which Chongqing once belonged, and Guizhou (Qian 黔).

The line was electrified in 1991. Major cities and towns along route include Chongqing, Qijiang, Tongzi, Zunyi, and Guiyang. The Chuanqian railway is a major rail conduit in western China from Baotou in Inner Mongolia to the Gulf of Tonkin.

Route
The Sichuan–Guizhou railway originates in the north from the Chongqing railway station and shares tracks with the Chengdu–Chongqing railway to Xiaonanhai.  The line crosses the Yangtze River via the Baishatuo Railway Bridge and passes through Qijiang before entering northern Guizhou, where it ends at Guiyang railway station.  The Liangfengya Tunnel  on the Chuanqian Line in Tongzi was the longest railway tunnel in China when it was built.

Rail connections
Chongqing: Chengdu–Chongqing railway, Xiangyang–Chongqing railway, Chongqing–Huaihua railway, Chongqing–Lichuan railway
Guiyang: Shanghai–Kunming railway, Guizhou–Guangxi railway

See also

 List of railways in China

References

Railway lines in China
Rail transport in Chongqing
Rail transport in Guizhou